Romanaria leuca is a species of moth of the family Tortricidae. It is found in Napo Province, Ecuador.

The wingspan is 16 mm. The ground colour of the forewings is cream with a slight admixture of ochreous brownish. The dorsum is sprinkled with brownish and there are a few pale brownish dots along the termen. The markings are pale brown. The hindwings are cream.

Etymology
The species name refers to the colouration of the species and is derived from Latin leuca (meaning pale).

References

Moths described in 2009
Euliini
Taxa named by Józef Razowski
Moths of South America